Roy Harold Carlson (May 8, 1906 – September 10, 1984) was an American football player. He played college football at Bradley and professional football in the National Football League (NFL) as an end and guard for the Chicago Bears in 1928 and the Dayton Triangles in 1929. He appeared in 16 NFL games, seven as a starter. He died on September 10, 1984. He was survived by his wife, Ellen; sister, Fern Hoff; and brother, Phillip.

References

1906 births
1984 deaths
Bradley Braves football players
Chicago Bears players
Dayton Triangles players
Players of American football from Illinois